Monilia may refer to:

 an old spelling of Monilinia, a genus of fungus which may cause crop diseases, such as brown rot of fruit
 Moniliophthora roreri, a pathogen of cocoa and other species in or related to the genus Theobroma
 Candida albicans, a pathogenic yeast in humans and other mammals
 Strepsicrates, a genus of moth